6,6'-Dibromoindigo is an organic compound with the formula (BrC6H3C(O)CNH)2.  A deep purple solid, the compound is also known as Tyrian purple, a dye of historic significance.  Presently, it is only a curiosity, although the related derivative indigo is of industrial significance.  The molecule consists of a pair of monobrominated indole rings linked by a carbon-carbon double bond.  It is produced by molluscs of the Muricidae species.

Biosynthesis
The biosynthesis proceeds by the intermediacy of tyrindoxyl sulphate.

6BrIG can also produced enzymatically in vitro from the amino acid tryptophan.  The sequence begins with bromination of the benzo ring followed by conversion to 6-bromoindole.  Flavin-containing monooxygenase then couples two of these indole units to give the dye.

Chemical synthesis
The main chemical constituent of the Tyrian dye was discovered by Paul Friedländer in 1909 to be 6,6′-dibromoindigo, derivative of indigo dye, which had been synthesized in 1903. Although the first chemical synthesis was reported in 1914, unlike indigo, it has never been synthesized at commercial level. An efficient protocol for laboratory synthesis of dibromoindigo was developed in 2010.

References

Indigo structure dyes
Bromoarenes